The Abishemu obelisk or the Abichemou obelisk is a 1.25 meter limestone obelisk dedicated to the Phoenician king Abishemu I of Byblos. The obelisk is decorated with two lines of inscriptions in Egyptian hieroglyphics. It was created in c.1800 BCE, and was unearthed in the 1950s by Maurice Dunand in the Temple of the Obelisks. It is the world's third-oldest obelisk, and by far the oldest obelisk found outside Egypt.

Although only approximately a dozen words long, the obelisk contains:
 the name of one of the oldest known kings of Byblos, Abishemu I
 the earliest description of an ethnic group later considered to be among the purported "Sea Peoples", transliterated as Kukunnis, son of Lukka" (in analysis of the Sea Peoples, Lukka have been proposed as "Lycians".
 a reference to "Herishef", considered by Dunand to be the Egyptian name of the Canaanite god Resheph, and thus giving the alternate name "Temple of Resheph" for the Temple of the Obelisks

The obelisk is the only example of a complete obelisk with a true pyramidion found in the Temple of the Obelisks; most of the others were rough steles. It consists of a square plinth at the bottom, a tapering shaft and with a pyramidion at the top.

Inscription

Transcribed:
mry Ḥr-š·f ḥꜣty-ʻ n Kpny ʼb-šmw wḥm ʻnḫ

[...]f Kwkwn śꜣ Rwqq mꜣʻ ḫrw
Translated:
Beloved of Arsaphes [also translated Herishef], Abishemu, prince of Byblos, renewed in life, his..., Kukun, son of 'the Lycian' justified (i. e., deceased).

See also
 Kings of Byblos
 List of Egyptian obelisks

Notes

References

Editio princeps
Maurice Dunand, Fouilles de Byblos, volume 2, p. 878, no. 16980; and plate XXXII number 2

Secondary sources

18th-century BC works
Byblos
Ancient Egyptian obelisks
Byblos
Phoenician steles
Collections of the National Museum of Beirut